is a Buddhist temple complex in Nara founded by Queen Bunchi, daughter of Emperor Go-Mizunoo, in 1656.  Together with Chūgū-ji and Hokke-ji, it is considered one of the Three Yamato Monzeki (大和三門跡), or imperial temples, belonging to the Myōshin-ji school of Rinzai Zen.

The temple is also home to the head office of the ikebana school called Yamamura Go-ryū (山村御流). 

The temple is not open to the public.

See also 
 Daikaku-ji in Kyoto

References

Religious organizations established in the 17th century
Buddhist temples in Nara Prefecture
Monzeki